Akatsuki-class destroyer may refer to:

 , a class of two torpedo boat destroyers of the Imperial Japanese Navy during the Russo-Japanese War

Note: In 1904, during the Russo-Japanese War, Japan captured  the Imperial Russian Navy destroyer Reshitelny. She was recommissioned in the Imperial Japanese Navy in 1905 as Akatsuki, becoming its own class. However, in 1906, the ship was renamed Yamabiko, the class again adopted the name of its lead (and only) ship.

See also
 Akatsuki (disambiguation)
 

Destroyers of the Imperial Japanese Navy